Valerie Smith may refer to:

Valerie Brown, aka Valerie Smith, a character from the Josie and the Pussycats comics
Valerie Smith (academic) (born 1956), American scholar and current president of Swarthmore College
Valerie Smith (social activist), Canadian social activist
Valerie Smith, born Violet Barclay (1922–2010), an American illustrator
Valerie Smith (musician) (born 1966), American bluegrass musician
Valerie Smith (athlete) from Athletics at the 1984 Summer Paralympics
Valerie Smith (swimmer) from Swimming at the 1984 Summer Paralympics

See also
Victor Barker, born Valerie Arkell-Smith (1895–1960), a transgender man notable for marrying a woman in 1923
Valerie Phare-Smith, Libertarian representative of in the 1979 Canadian federal elections